Larry Rowe (10 January 1941 – 18 October 2012) was  an Australian rules footballer who played with Richmond in the Victorian Football League (VFL)  and Caulfield in the Victorian Football Association (VFA).		
		
Following the end of his VFL career in 1961, Rowe played for and captained Brighton-Caulfield Football Club in the VFA and its successor, Caulfield Football Club. Rowe played 70 matches for Caulfield from 1965 to 1968, all as captain, winning the Jack Field Medal for VFA Second Division Best and Fairest in 1967, Caulfield's Best and Fairest in 1966 and 1967 and Leading Goalkicker in 1965, 1966 and 1967.

Notes

Sources
 Piesse, Ken (2010) The Bears Uncensored, Football & Cricket Books: Melbourne. .

External links 		
		
		
		
		
		
		
		
1941 births		
2012 deaths		
Australian rules footballers from Victoria (Australia)		
Richmond Football Club players
Caulfield Football Club players